The National Union of Dock Labourers (NUDL) was a trade union in the United Kingdom which existed between 1889 and 1922.

History 

It was formed in Glasgow in 1889 but moved its headquarters to Liverpool within a few years and was thereafter most closely associated with Merseyside. The union retained a strong presence in a number of Scottish ports but closed its Glasgow branch in 1910 and was replaced locally by the Scottish Union of Dock Labourers, which was formed during the seamen's and dockers strikes of 1911. In Ireland, the NUDL was largely replaced by the Irish Transport and General Workers' Union after 1908.

The NUDL, by this time renamed the National Union of Dock, Riverside and General Workers in Great Britain and Ireland, joined the Transport and General Workers' Union before the end of 1922, although its membership had originally voted not to join the amalgamation earlier in the year. It was therefore not actually a founder member of the TGWU, although it is often falsely credited as being one.

General Secretaries
1889: Edward McHugh
1893: James Sexton

References

Further reading
Andrew G. Newby,  The Life and Times of Edward McHugh (1853 - 1915): Land Reformer, Trade Unionist, and Labour Activist
Eric Taplin, The Dockers' Union: A Study of the National Union of Dock Labourers, 1889-1922, Leicester University Press, 1986.

Defunct trade unions of the United Kingdom
Port workers' trade unions
Water transport in the United Kingdom
1889 establishments in the United Kingdom
Transport and General Workers' Union amalgamations
Trade unions established in 1889
Trade unions disestablished in 1922
Trade unions based in Merseyside